Ashland Township may refer to:

 Ashland Township, Cass County, Illinois
 Ashland Township, Morgan County, Indiana
 Ashland Township, Michigan
 Ashland Township, Dodge County, Minnesota
 Ashland Township, Saunders County, Nebraska
 Ashland Township, Clarion County, Pennsylvania

Township name disambiguation pages